Hàm Rồng may refer to the following places in Vietnam:

Hàm Rồng, Cà Mau, a commune of Năm Căn District
Hàm Rồng, Thanh Hóa, a ward of Thanh Hóa city
Hàm Rồng, Lào Cai, a ward of Sa Pa